Arthur Lonergan (January 23, 1906 – January 23, 1989) was an American art director. He was nominated for an Academy Award in the category Best Art Direction for the film The Oscar. He also was the art director for the films Forbidden Planet, Yours, Mine and Ours and M*A*S*H.

Selected filmography
 Forbidden Planet (1956)
 The Oscar (1966)
 M*A*S*H (1970)

References

External links

1906 births
1989 deaths
American art directors
Artists from New York City